Nangloi railway station is a small railway station in North Delhi district, National Capital Region. Its code is NNO. It serves Nangloi city. The station consists of two platforms. The platforms are not well sheltered. It lacks many facilities including water and sanitation. The station is part of Delhi Suburban Railway.

Major trains

The following trains run from Nangloi railway station :

 Avadh Assam Express
 Bhiwani–Delhi Passenger (unreserved)
 Delhi–Jind Passenger (unreserved)
 Delhi–Kurukshetra DEMU (via Kaithal)
 Delhi–Rohtak Passenger (unreserved)
 Delhi–Firozpur Passenger (unreserved)
 Delhi–Jind Jakhal Passenger (unreserved)
 Delhi Jn–Rohtak MEMU
 Delhi–Narwana Passenger (unreserved)
 Delhi–Rohtak Passenger
 Dhauladhar Express
 Firozpur Janata Express
 Gorakhdham Express
 Hazrat Nizamuddin–Rohtak Passenger (unreserved)
 Jind–Delhi Passenger (unreserved)
 Kisan Express
 New Delhi–Rohtak Intercity Express
 Sirsa Express
 Udyan Abha Toofan Express
 Dhauladhar Express

References

Railway stations in North Delhi district
Delhi railway division